Claytonia palustris is a species of wildflower in the family Montiaceae known by the common names Jonesville springbeauty and marsh claytonia.

Distribution
The wildflower is endemic to California where it is an uncommon member of the flora in wet areas such as spring meadows in the high mountains from the Klamath Range to the High Sierra.
The species epithet palustris is Latin for "of the marsh" and indicates its common habitat.  The species is diploid (2n = 12) with a chromosome base number of x = 6.

Description

It has leaves with oval-shaped blades a few centimeters long at the ends of long, narrow petioles.

The inflorescence bears up to 18 flowers on a long stalk. Each flower has 5 white or pink-tinted white petals just under a centimeter long. The bloom period is May to October.

References

External links

 Calflora Database: Claytonia palustris (Jonesville springbeauty,  Marsh claytonia)
Jepson Manual Treatment
Flora North America
Photo gallery

palustris
Endemic flora of California
Flora of the Cascade Range
Flora of the Klamath Mountains
Flora of the Sierra Nevada (United States)
Plants described in 1987
Flora without expected TNC conservation status